Deriba is a Pleistocene or Holocene caldera in Darfur, Sudan. Part of the volcanoes of the Marra Mountains, it lies on the Darfur dome and like the Tagabo Hills and Meidob Hills volcanism may be the product of a mantle plume. After the separation of South Sudan, the highest point of Sudan is on the margin of the caldera.

The caldera lies atop a shield volcano or ash cone in the southern Marra Mountains, which developed first as a pile of basaltic lava flows and later as layers of volcanic ash and tuff, including the eruptions that formed the caldera. A large eruption occurred about 3,520 ± 100 years before present, and hot springs and fumaroles are active to the present day.

Deriba contains two lakes, one in the northeastern side of the main caldera and the other in a cone in the southwestern sector of the Deriba caldera. The fresher southwestern lake is smaller but considerably deeper than the saltier northeastern lake; in the late Pleistocene the caldera was filled with a larger lake.

Geography and geomorphology 

Deriba lies in the Marra Mountains of Sudan, Africa's geographic centre; Deriba is in the southern sector of these mountains and close to the main summit thereof.  The caldera rim became Sudan's new highest point, after the independence of South Sudan. The town of Nyala lies south of Deriba. The volcano is poorly studied due to the ongoing Darfur conflict.

At least five overlapping vents form the volcanic cone. The caldera is cut into volcanic ash, lapilli, lavas, obsidian and tuffs, and the floor is strewn with pumice blocks. A gap lies in the eastern caldera wall.

Lakes 

Deriba contains two lakes, which are known as the "Deriba lakes". The lake is surrounded by a gradually sloping muddy beach with the exception of the northern shore. This lake is also known as the "female" lake, with green salty water. The salt consists of chloride, potassium and sodium salts.

Steep slopes surround this lake, which is filled with fresher water. Reportedly, the local Fur people considered the lake haunted, but the lakes were also used as a source for salt.

Water levels in these lakes are fairly stable from season to season although evidence for substantial fluctuations have been found that correlate to the regional climate and to fluctuations in the water levels of Lake Chad. Together with several perennial streams they are thus perennial waterbodies. Around the Deriba caldera, drainage occurs either southward or westward, leading into the Bahr El-Arab of the White Nile and the Chari River of Lake Chad respectively. The lakes themselves have no surface outlets.

In the past, larger lakes existed inside the Deriba caldera. Similar lake stages have been documented in Trou au Natron in Tibesti, where shifts of the position of the subtropical jet stream and the tropical depressions associated with the jet stream have been invoked as an explanation. These lake stages have left shorelines and limestone deposits in the caldera, and it is likely that the lakes sometimes overflowed through the eastern caldera rim gap.

Geology 

Deriba is part of Jebel Marra volcano, which together with the Tagabo Hills and the Meidob Hills is one of three volcanic fields in Darfur; these form the little known Darfur Volcanic Province.

Jebel Marra consists of a pile of mostly basaltic lava which has been covered by pumice and volcanic ash as well as pyroclastic rocks and ignimbrites. The Deriba caldera which forms the top of the entire complex, which around Deriba has the appearance of a large ash cone or shield volcano. Other, less spectacular vents are found elsewhere in the Marra Mountains. Erosion has cut canyons into the volcanic complex. The occurrence of volcanism has been explained with a mantle plume centered between Meidob and Jebel Marra.

The basement is formed by crystalline rocks, mainly metamorphosed gneisses and schists, and is a mobile belt of Panafrican age. Tectonic uplift of the Darfur dome commenced in the Cretaceous and resulted in a noticeable upwarp of the basement beneath Jebel Marra. Two major tectonic lineaments intersect at Jebel Marra, one trending south-southeastward and the other east-northeastward.

Eruptive history 

Volcanism in the Jebel Marra mountains appears to have begin 15 million years ago and continued in two stages, separated by an erosional period. Volcanism in the southwestern Marra mountains took place between 4.35 million years ago and 60,000 years ago, subdivided into an Old Series and a New Series which is younger than 2 million years ago. After an initial stage, during which olivine basalt and small amounts of pyroclastic material were erupted, trachyte were emplaced. The Deriba caldera probably formed either in the early Pleistocene, 60,000 or 3,520 ± 100 years before present (BP), but activity continued with the volcanic cone inside of the caldera and peripheral vents, possibly into historical time.

The 3,520 ± 100 BP eruption was a Plinian eruption that deposited pyroclastic material containing blocks of basement material. The eruption has an estimated volcanic explosivity index of 4 and may be associated with the volcanic cone inside the caldera.

The volcano was formerly considered to be extinct. Hot springs, whose temperature reaches  and which may be supplied by magmatic water, and fumaroles, both within the caldera around the volcanic cone and in the surrounding Marra Mountains, indicate that Jebel Marra and the Deriba caldera are a dormant volcano. Reportedly, the exhalations of the fumaroles can kill birds and insects, and some fumarolic vents may have formed between 1964 and 1966, implying that the fumarolic activity may reflect a recent change of volcanic activity.

Climate 

Jebel Marra has a humid subtropical climate (Cwa) bordering on a subtropical highland climate (Cwb). Between 12,000 and 8,000 years before present, the climate was wetter as a consequence of a northward shift of climate zones.

Biology 

Vegetation around Deriba consists of grassland with scarce trees such as the wild olive. The plant life is classified as Afromontane, it also includes species from temperate climates. It is likely that past humid periods permitted the expansion of Mediterranean species into the Jebel Marra mountains. Presently, Jebel Marra is a suitable site for agriculture and used as such by the Fur people. Semidesert and desert landscapes dominate the region around the Marra Mountains.

The lakes are salty, oxygen poor and remote and thus contain little plant or animal life. Some vegetation grows around the smaller lake, as well as in other parts of the Deriba caldera where water is available.

Copepods live in the smaller lake, while the larger one is populated by blue-green algae and rotifers. Spirulina occurs in the large lake, and Melosira and Nitzscia diatoms have been identified in the small lake. The copepod Eucyclops gibsoni has been encountered in the small lake. Among the rotifers are Brachionus dimidiatus, Brachionus plicatilis, Hexarthra jenkinae and Lecane bulla, some of which also occur in the smaller lake. Ephedra flies are widespread around the large lake, and other insects were collected on the small lake. Birds are uncommon, with greenshanks, little grebes, sacred ibis and stilts.

Gallery

References

Sources

External links
 Satellite image (large scale) : 
 Oblique aerial photo on page 27 (large scale) : 
 Deriba Caldera at NASA Earth Observatory

Marrah Mountains
Volcanoes of Sudan
Darfur
Volcanic crater lakes
Dormant volcanoes
Calderas of Africa
Highest points of countries
VEI-4 volcanoes